João Salaviza (born João Salaviza Manso Feldman da Silva; 19 February 1984) is a Portuguese film director, screenwriter, editor, producer, and former actor. He is the recipient of several accolades, including the Short Film Golden Bear, the Short Film Palme d'Or, and the Un Certain Regard.

Biography
João Salaviza was born on 19 February 1984, in Lisbon, Portugal. His father is José Edgar Feldman, a film director, and his mother is a producer. He studied at the Lisbon Theatre and Film School and at the Universidad del Cine de Buenos Aires, in Buenos Aires, Argentina. 

His film Arena won the Short Film Palme d'Or at the 2009 Cannes Film Festival. In 2012, his film Rafa won the Golden Bear for Best Short Film at the 62nd Berlin International Film Festival. Salaviza worked as assistant editor in Manoel de Oliveira's Eccentricities of a Blonde-haired Girl.

Filmography

Short films
 Duas Pessoas (2004)
 Arena (2009)
 Casa Na Comporta (2010)
 Hotel Müller (2010)
 Cerro Negro (2012)
 Rafa (2012)
 Russa (2018)

Documentary
 STROKKUR (2011)
 High Cities of Bone (2017)

Films
 Montanha (2015)
 The Dead and the Others (2018)

References

External links
 

1984 births
Living people
Portuguese film directors
Portuguese documentary film directors
Portuguese screenwriters
Male screenwriters
Portuguese film editors
Portuguese film producers
Portuguese male film actors
People from Lisbon
Male actors from Lisbon
Lisbon Theatre and Film School alumni